Never So Good is a 2008 play by Howard Brenton, which portrays the life and career of Harold Macmillan, a 20th-century Conservative British politician who served as Prime Minister (1957–1963).  It was first performed in the Lyttelton auditorium of the National Theatre, London, on 26 March 2008; previews began on 17 March 2008.

The play is divided into four acts, covering Macmillan's early life and military experience in World War I; his involvement in British politics during the descent into World War II; the Suez Crisis, during which he served as Chancellor of the Exchequer; and his service as Prime Minister, during which the reputation of his government was severely damaged by the Profumo affair. Macmillan's younger self remains with him, providing mocking commentary.

The National Theatre production was directed by Howard Davies. The cast included Jeremy Irons as Harold Macmillan, Anthony Calf as Anthony Eden, Pip Carter as young Harold Macmillan, Anna Carteret as Nellie Macmillan, Anna Chancellor as Dorothy Macmillan and Ian McNeice as Winston Churchill, whom he would later play in several episodes of Doctor Who.

References

External links
 John Thaxter "Never So Good" review in The Stage, 27 March 2008
 Michael Billington "Never So Good" review in The Guardian, 28 March 2008
 Charles Spencer "Jeremy Irons shines in Never So Good" review in The Daily Telegraph, 28 March 2008
 Susannah Clapp "Supermac returns" review in The Observer, 30 March 2008
 National Theatre page for the opening production
 Never So Good (script), Howard Brenton (2008), published by Nick Hern Books Limited, 

English plays
2008 plays
Cultural depictions of Winston Churchill
Cultural depictions of British prime ministers
Cultural depictions of British men
Biographical plays about politicians
Plays set in England
Plays based on real people
Plays set in the 1950s
Harold Macmillan